The Newborn Child is an oil-on-canvas painting created c. 1645–1648 by the French painter Georges de La Tour, now in the Museum of Fine Arts of Rennes in France. It is sometimes thought to be a representation of the Madonna and Child (with the left-hand woman as St Anne) in the form of a genre scene – it is thus also known as The Nativity.

References

Paintings of the Madonna and Child
1648 paintings
Paintings in the collection of the Museum of Fine Arts of Rennes
Paintings by Georges de La Tour